The Hungarian Mixed Curling Championship is the national championship of mixed curling teams in Hungary. It has been held annually since 2005.

List of champions and medallists
Teams line-up in order: fourth, third, second, lead, alternate; skips marked bold.

References

See also
Hungarian Men's Curling Championship
Hungarian Women's Curling Championship
Hungarian Mixed Doubles Curling Championship

Curling competitions in Hungary
Curling
Recurring sporting events established in 2005
2005 establishments in Hungary
National curling championships
Mixed curling